Genophantis iodora is a moth of the family Pyralidae described by Edward Meyrick in 1888. It is endemic to the Hawaiian islands of Kauai, Oahu, Molokai and Hawaii.

The wingspan is 22–27 mm.

The larvae feed on Euphorbia celastroides and Euphorbia clusiaefolia. They web together the leaves of their host plant.

External links

Phycitinae
Endemic moths of Hawaii
Moths described in 1888